At least three ships vessels of the French Navy have borne the name Thémis, in honour of the Titaness Themis:
 Thémis (1801), a frigate
 Oder (1813), a frigate, was renamed Thémis
 Thémis (1862), a frigate

French Navy ship names